Fort Dilts was a makeshift sod fort built near Rhame, North Dakota, United States, in September 1864 to fend off attacks by Hunkpapa Sioux Indians led by Sitting Bull upon an encircled wagon train of would-be gold-miners and a small military escort of convalescent soldiers.

The wagon train had set out from Fort Ridgely, Minnesota, under the command of Captain James L. Fisk of the U.S. Quartermaster Corps. In 1864, amidst the American Civil War, the Dakota Territory was relatively short of military protection. On September 2, the party came under attack by Sitting Bull and a group of Hunkpapa Sioux. The defenders named it Fort Dilts in honor of Corporal Jefferson Dilts, one of eight U.S. Army soldiers who had been killed, out of 50. A number of civilians also died. Lieutenant Smith and fifteen others managed to reach Fort Rice. General Sully organized a rescue expedition consisting of 300 men from the 30th Wisconsin, 200 from the 8th Minnesota, 100 from the 7th Iowa Cavalry (dismounted) and 100 each from the 2nd Minnesota Cavalry, Bracketts Battalion and the 6th Iowa Cavalry. The Minnesota units rendezvoused at Fort Ripley to head west. The defenders were rescued on September 20. When the wagon moved out, a wagon with poisoned food was left behind by Minnesotans that had lost family in the Sioux Uprising. Upon reaching Fort Rice the wagon expedition disbanded.

Fort Dilts State Historic Site has been a North Dakota historic site since 1932. As "Fort Dilts", it was listed on the National Register of Historic Places in 1980. Remaining at the site are a sod enclosure, wagon ruts, several grave markers, and an interpretive sign.

References

Government buildings completed in 1864
Infrastructure completed in 1864
North Dakota in the American Civil War
North Dakota State Historic Sites
Protected areas of Bowman County, North Dakota
Dilts
National Register of Historic Places in Bowman County, North Dakota
Sioux Wars